Dewayne Everettsmith is an Australian singer based in Hobart. He released his debut album Surrender in 2014. The album includes the song "Melaythina" which is the first commercially available song sung in Palawa kani.

His song "It's Like Love" with Jasmine Beams was featured in a Tourism Australia advertising campaign. He has performed as part of The Black Arm Band  and alongside Briggs and Gurrumul on the update of Archie Roach's Charcoal Lane.

Discography
Surrender (2014) - Skinnyfish

References

Indigenous Australian musicians
Musicians from Tasmania
Australian male singers
Living people
Year of birth missing (living people)